Mexico–Portugal relations are the diplomatic relations between Mexico and  Portugal. Both nations are members of the Organization of Ibero-American States, Organisation for Economic Co-operation and Development and the United Nations.

History 
The first official diplomatic contacts between Mexico and Portugal took place in 1843 in when ambassadors of both nations met in Washington, D.C. Diplomatic relations were not established officially until 20 October 1864 under the government of Emperor Maximilian I of Mexico. In 1884, Mexico opened its first diplomatic mission in Lisbon; however, the mission was closed in 1918 when Portugal refused to recognize the government of Mexican President Venustiano Carranza. Diplomatic relations were restored between the two nations in 1929. In 1959, diplomatic missions were opened in Lisbon and in Mexico City, respectively, and were elevated to the level of embassies.

In January 1990, President Carlos Salinas de Gortari became the first Mexican head of state to visit Portugal. In July 1991, Portuguese Prime Minister Aníbal Cavaco Silva and President Mario Soares visited the city of Guadalajara, Mexico to attend the first Ibero-American Summit. In October 2013, Portuguese Prime Minister Pedro Passos Coelho visited Mexico on an official state visit. The visit was to mark the beginning of 150 years of the establishment of diplomatic relations between the two nations. In June 2014, Mexican President Enrique Peña Nieto visited Portugal on a state visit to commemorate the 150 years of diplomatic relations between both nations.

On 17 July 2017, Portuguese President Marcelo Rebelo de Sousa paid a state visit to Mexico and was received by President Enrique Peña Nieto. During the meeting, both Presidents agreed to boost Portuguese investment in Mexico and for Mexican companies to increase their presence and export products to Portugal. Both leaders also agreed to promote tourism and to encourage bilateral cooperation in science and technology.

High-level visits

High-level visits from Mexico to Portugal

 President Carlos Salinas de Gortari (1990)
 President Ernesto Zedillo (1998, 2000)
 President Felipe Calderón (2009)
 President Enrique Peña Nieto (2014)

High-level visits from Portugal to Mexico

 President Mario Soares (1991)
 Prime Minister Aníbal Cavaco Silva (1991)
 Prime Minister António Guterres (1996)
 President Jorge Sampaio (1999)
 Prime Minister Pedro Passos Coelho (2013)
 President Aníbal Cavaco Silva (1991)
 President Marcelo Rebelo de Sousa (2017)
 Prime Minister António Costa (2018)

Bilateral agreements
Both nations have signed several bilateral agreements such as an Agreement on Scientific and Cultural Cooperation (1977); Agreement on Economic and Trade Cooperation (1980); Agreement on Tourism (1996); Treaty of Mutual Legal Assistance in Criminal Matters (1998); Extradition Treaty (1998); Agreement on the Avoidance of Double-Taxation and Fiscal Evasion (1999); Agreement on the Promotion and Reciprocal Protection of Investments (1999); Agreement on Air Transportation (2013); and an Agreement of Cooperation in the Area of Demand, Reduction and Fight against Illicit Trafficking in Narcotic Drugs and Psychotropic Substances (2013).

Transportation
There are direct flights between Cancún International Airport and Lisbon Airport with Iberojet, TAP and World2Fly airlines.

Trade
In 1997, Mexico signed a Free Trade Agreement with the European Union, of which Portugal is a member of. Since the implementation of the free trade agreement in 2000, trade between the two nations has increased dramatically. In 2018, total trade between the two nations amounted to $853 million USD. Mexico's main exports to Portugal include: crude oil, vehicles, garbanzo beans and cauliflowers. Portugal's main exports to Mexico include: speedometers and tachometers; stroboscopes; rubber and plastic molds and electrical appliances.

Portugal is the 14th source of foreign direct investment for Mexico among the countries of the European Union and the 39th worldwide. Mexican multinational companies Grupo Bimbo, Grupo Carso and Vitro operate in Portugal.

Resident diplomatic missions 

 Mexico has an embassy in Lisbon.
 Portugal has an embassy in Mexico City.

See also 
Portuguese Mexican

References

 
Portugal
Bilateral relations of Portugal